The Rijksmuseum is the national museum of the Netherlands dedicated to Dutch arts and history and is located in Amsterdam. The museum is located at the Museum Square in the borough of Amsterdam South, close to the Van Gogh Museum, the Stedelijk Museum Amsterdam, and the Concertgebouw.

The Rijksmuseum was founded in The Hague on 19 November 1798 and moved to Amsterdam in 1808, where it was first located in the Royal Palace and later in the Trippenhuis. The current main building was designed by Pierre Cuypers and first opened in 1885. On 13 April 2013, after a ten-year renovation which cost € 375 million, the main building was reopened by Queen Beatrix. In 2013 and 2014, it was the most visited museum in the Netherlands with record numbers of 2.2 million and 2.47 million visitors. It is also the largest art museum in the country.

The museum has on display 8,000 objects of art and history, from their total collection of 1 million objects from the years 1200–2000, among which are some masterpieces by Rembrandt, Frans Hals, and Johannes Vermeer. The museum also has a small Asian collection, which is on display in the Asian pavilion.

History
The collection of the Rijksmuseum was built over a period of 200 years and did not originate from a royal collection incorporated into a national museum. Its origins were modest, with its collection fitting into five rooms at in Huis ten Bosch palace in The Hague. Although the seventeenth century was beginning to be recognized as the key period in Dutch art, the museum did not then hold paintings by Frans Hals, Rembrandt, Jan Steen, Johannes Vermeer, or Jacob van Ruisdael. The collection was built up by purchase and donation.  Napoleon had carried off the stadholder's collection to Paris; the paintings were returned to The Netherlands in 1815 but housed in the Mauritshuis in The Hague rather than the Rijksmuseum. With the founding of the Rijksmuseum in 1885, holdings from other entities were brought together to establish the Rijksmuseum's major collections.

18th century

In 1795, the Batavian Republic was proclaimed; its Minister of Finance Isaac Gogel argued that a national museum, following the French example of The Louvre, would serve the national interest. On 19 November 1798, the government decided to found the museum.

19th century
On 31 May 1800, the National Art Gallery (Dutch: Nationale Kunst-Galerij), precursor of the Rijksmuseum, opened in Huis ten Bosch in The Hague. The museum exhibited around 200 paintings and historic objects from the collections of the Dutch stadtholders. 
In 1805, the National Art Gallery moved within The Hague to the Prince William V Gallery, on the Buitenhof. In 1806, the Kingdom of Holland was established by Napoleon Bonaparte. On the orders of king Louis Bonaparte, brother of Napoleon, the museum moved to Amsterdam in 1808. Paintings owned by that city, such as The Night Watch by Rembrandt, became part of the collection. In 1809, the museum opened in the Royal Palace in Amsterdam.

In 1817, the museum moved to the Trippenhuis. The Trippenhuis turned out to be unsuitable as a museum. In 1820, the historical objects were moved to the Mauritshuis in The Hague and in 1838, the 19th-century paintings "of living masters" were moved to King Louis Bonaparte's former summer palace Paviljoen Welgelegen in Haarlem.

In 1863, there was a design contest for a new building for the Rijksmuseum, but none of the submissions was considered to be of sufficient quality. Pierre Cuypers also participated in the contest and his submission reached the second place.

In 1876, a new contest was held and this time Pierre Cuypers won. The design was a combination of gothic and renaissance elements. The construction began on 1 October 1876. On both the inside and the outside, the building was richly decorated with references to Dutch art history. Another contest was held for these decorations. The winners were B. van Hove and J.F. Vermeylen for the sculptures, G. Sturm for the tile tableaus and painting and W.F. Dixon for the stained glass. The museum was opened at its new location on 13 July 1885.

In 1890, a new building was added a short distance to the south-west of the Rijksmuseum. As the building was made out of fragments of demolished buildings, the building offers an overview of the history of Dutch architecture and has come to be known informally as the 'fragment building'. It is also known as the 'south wing' and is currently (in 2013) branded the Philips Wing.

20th century

In 1906, the hall for The Night Watch was rebuilt. In the interior more changes were made between the 1920s and 1950s – most multi-coloured wall decorations were painted over. In the 1960s exposition rooms and several floors were built into the two courtyards. The building had some minor renovations and restorations in 1984, 1995–1996, and 2000.

A renovation of the south wing of the museum, also known as the 'fragment building' or 'Philips Wing', was completed in 1996, the same year that the museum held its first major photography exhibition featuring its extensive collection of 19th-century photos.

21st century

In December 2003, the main building of the museum closed for a major renovation. During this renovation, about 400 objects from the collection were on display in the 'fragment building', including Rembrandt's The Night Watch and other 17th-century masterpieces.

The restoration and renovation of the Rijksmuseum are based on a design by Spanish architects Antonio Cruz and Antonio Ortiz. Many of the old interior decorations were restored and the floors in the courtyards were removed. The renovation would have initially taken five years, but was delayed and eventually took almost ten years to complete. The renovation cost € 375 million.

The reconstruction of the building was completed on 16 July 2012. In March 2013, the museum's main pieces of art were moved back from the 'fragment building' (Philips Wing) to the main building. The Night Watch returned to the Night Watch Room, at the end of the Hall of Fame. On 13 April 2013, the main building was reopened by Queen Beatrix. On 1 November 2014, the Philips Wing reopened with the exhibition Modern Times: Photography in the 20th Century.

List of directors

 Cornelis Sebille Roos
 Cornelis Apostool (1808–1844)
 Jan Willem Pieneman (1844–1847)
 Johann Wilhelm Kaiser (1873–1883)
 Frederik Daniël Otto Obreen (1883–1896)
 Barthold Willem Floris van Riemsdijk (1897–1921)
 Frederik Schmidt-Degener (1921–1941)
 David Röell (1945–1959)
 Arthur F.E. van Schendel (1959–1975)
 Simon Levie (1975–1989)
 Henk van Os (1989–1996)
 Ronald de Leeuw (1996–2008)
 Wim Pijbes (2008–2016)
 Taco Dibbits (2016–present)

Building 
The building of the Rijksmuseum was designed by Pierre Cuypers and opened in 1885. It consists of two squares with an atrium in each centre. In the central axis is a tunnel with the entrances at ground level and the Gallery of Honour at the first floor. The building also contains a library. The fragment building, branded Philips wing, contains building fragments that show the history of architecture in the Netherlands. The Rijksmuseum is a rijksmonument (national heritage site) since 1970 and was listed in the Top 100 Dutch heritage sites in 1990. The Asian pavilion was designed by Cruz y Ortiz and opened in 2013.

According to Muriel Huisman, Project Architect for the Rijksmuseum's renovation, "Cruz y Ortiz always like to look for synergy between old and new, and we try not to explain things with our architecture.” With the Rijks, “there’s no cut between old and new; we’ve tried to merge it. We did this by looking for materials that were true to the original building, resulting in a kind of silent architecture."

Collection

The collection of the Rijksmuseum consists of 1 million objects and is dedicated to arts, crafts, and history from the years 1200 to 2000. Around 8,000 objects are currently on display in the museum.

The collection contains more than 2,000 paintings from the Dutch Golden Age by notable painters such as Jacob van Ruisdael, Frans Hals, Johannes Vermeer, Jan Steen, Rembrandt, and Rembrandt's pupils.

The museum also has a small Asian collection which is on display in the Asian pavilion.

In 2012, the museum made some 125,000 high-resolution images available for download via its Rijksstudio webplatform, with plans to add another 40,000 images per year until the entire collection of one million works is available, according to Taco Dibbits, director of collections. As of January 2021, the Rijksstudio hosts 700,000 works, available under a Creative Commons 1.0 Universal license, essentially copyright-free and royalty-free.

Gallery

Special Exhibitions

Rembrandt
in 2019, to mark the 350th anniversary of the artist's death, the museum mounted an exhibition of all the works by Rembrandt in its collection. Consisting of 22 paintings, 60 drawings and over 300 prints, this was the first time they had all been exhibited together. Principal features were the marriage portraits of Marten Soolmans and Oopjen Coppit along with the presentation of the Night Watch immediately before its planned restoration. The exhibition ran from February to June.

Slavery in the Dutch Empire 
After previous temporary exhibitions on art historical themes, the Rijksmuseum in 2021 presented an exhibition on the history of slavery in the Dutch colonial Empire, with more than a million people forced into slavery. It covered trans-Atlantic slavery from the 17th to the 19th century in Suriname, Brazil and the Caribbean, as well as Dutch colonial slavery in South Africa and Asia, where the Dutch West India Company (WIC) and the Dutch East India Company (VOC) were engaged in slavery. Besides objects, such as a wooden block for locking slaves, paintings, archival documents, oral sources, poems and music, the exhibition also presented connections of the slavery system at home in the Netherlands. In the permanent collection, labels were added to 77 paintings and objects that had been seen as symbols of the country's wealth and power to indicate previously hidden links to slavery.

The exhibition was presented both physically in the museum from May to August 2021 and in an online version. It was complemented by audio tours and videos relating personal and real-life stories as well as an accompanying book titled Slavery.

Vermeer 
From 10 February until June 2023 the Rijksmuseum began to exhibit the biggest collection of Vermeers ever, with 28 of the known 37 works on display. Curator Pieter Roelofs called it a "once in a lifetime" event. All time slot reservations were quickly sold out.

Number of visitors 

The 20th-century visitor record of 1,412,000 was reached in the year 1975.

In the 1990s and early 2000s, the Rijksmuseum was annually visited by 0.9 to 1.3 million people. On 7 December 2003, the main building of the museum was closed for a renovation until 13 April 2013. In the preceding decade, the number of visitors had slightly decreased to 0.8 to 1.1 million people. The museum says after the renovation, the museum's capacity is 1.5 to 2.0 million visitors annually. Within eight months since the reopening in 2013, the museum was visited by 2 million people.

The museum had 2.2 million visitors in 2013 and reached an all-time record of 2.47 million visitors in 2014. The museum was the most visited museum in the Netherlands and the 19th most visited art museum in the world in 2013 and 2014.

The COVID-19 pandemic forced the closure of the museum from December 15, 2020 until June 4, 2021.

Library
 
The Rijksmuseum Research Library is part of the Rijksmuseum, and is the best and the largest public art history research library in The Netherlands.

Restaurant 
Rijks, stylized as RIJKS®, is a restaurant with 140 seats in the Philips Wing. Joris Bijdendijk has been the chef de cuisine since the opening in 2014. The restaurant was awarded a Michelin star in 2017.

See also 
 Onze Kunst van Heden – exhibition held in the winter of 1939 through 1940

Notes

References

Further reading
 Netherlandish Art in the Rijksmuseum, 1400–1600. W Books 2000. 
 Netherlandish Art in the Rijksmuseum, 1600–1700. New Haven: Yale University Press 2000. 
 Netherlandish Art in the Rijksmuseum, 1700–1800. Waanders 2006.

External links
 
 Multimedia Content of museum
Virtual tour of the Rijksmuseum provided by Google Arts & Culture

 
1798 establishments in the Batavian Republic
Amsterdam-Zuid
Art museums and galleries in the Netherlands
Art museums established in 1798
Articles containing video clips
Museums in Amsterdam
National museums of the Netherlands
Order of Arts and Letters of Spain recipients
Pierre Cuypers buildings
Rijksmonuments in Amsterdam
18th-century architecture in the Netherlands